Atterson was an unincorporated community in  Casey County, Kentucky, United States. Its post office, along with the rest of the town, has ceased to exist.

References

Unincorporated communities in Casey County, Kentucky
Unincorporated communities in Kentucky